Fedaian Organisation or Organization of Fadaiyan (Minority) is an Iranian exiled Marxist-Leninist organisation. A small remainder faction of the disintegrated Organization of Iranian People's Fedai Guerrillas (Minority) led by Akbar Kāmyābi, the group is now based in Europe. They co-founded Union of People's Fedaian of Iran in 1994.

See also

References

External links
fadaian-minority.org

Communist parties in Iran
Banned communist parties
Banned political parties in Iran